In Greek mythology, Chromius (Ancient Greek: Χρόμιος) was the name of the following characters.

 Chromius, a Pylian prince as the son of King Neleus and Chloris, daughter of the Minyan king, Orchomenus.
 Chromius, a Taphian prince as the son of King Pterelaus of Taphos. Along with most of his brothers, he was killed by the sons of Electryon during their battle.
 Chromius, a Trojan prince as the son of King Priam of Troy. He was slain together with his brother Echemmon by Diomedes during the Trojan War.
 Chromius or Chromis, a Mysian ally of Priam in the Trojan War. He was the son of Arsinoos and brother of Ennomus.
Chromius, a Lycian soldier who followed their leader, Sarpedon, to fight in the Trojan War. He was slain by the Ithacan hero Odysseus.
Chromius, a native of Pylos who fought under their leader Nestor during the Trojan War.
Chromius, an Achaean warrior who was slayed in the Trojan War by the Mysian Eurypylus, son of King Telephus.
 Chromius, a defender of Troy killed by Teucer.
 Chromius, Trojan warrior.

See also 

 List of Trojan War characters

Notes

References 

 Apollodorus, The Library with an English Translation by Sir James George Frazer, F.B.A., F.R.S. in 2 Volumes, Cambridge, MA, Harvard University Press; London, William Heinemann Ltd. 1921. ISBN 0-674-99135-4. Online version at the Perseus Digital Library. Greek text available from the same website.
Homer, The Iliad with an English Translation by A.T. Murray, Ph.D. in two volumes. Cambridge, MA., Harvard University Press; London, William Heinemann, Ltd. 1924. . Online version at the Perseus Digital Library.
Homer, Homeri Opera in five volumes. Oxford, Oxford University Press. 1920. . Greek text available at the Perseus Digital Library.
 Homer, The Odyssey with an English Translation by A.T. Murray, Ph.D. in two volumes. Cambridge, MA., Harvard University Press; London, William Heinemann, Ltd. 1919. . Online version at the Perseus Digital Library. Greek text available from the same website.
 Gaius Julius Hyginus, Fabulae from The Myths of Hyginus translated and edited by Mary Grant. University of Kansas Publications in Humanistic Studies. Online version at the Topos Text Project.
 Publius Ovidius Naso, Metamorphoses translated by Brookes More (1859-1942). Boston, Cornhill Publishing Co. 1922. Online version at the Perseus Digital Library.
 Publius Ovidius Naso, Metamorphoses. Hugo Magnus. Gotha (Germany). Friedr. Andr. Perthes. 1892. Latin text available at the Perseus Digital Library.
Quintus Smyrnaeus, The Fall of Troy translated by Way. A. S. Loeb Classical Library Volume 19. London: William Heinemann, 1913. Online version at theio.com
Quintus Smyrnaeus, The Fall of Troy. Arthur S. Way. London: William Heinemann; New York: G.P. Putnam's Sons. 1913. Greek text available at the Perseus Digital Library.

Neleides
Trojans
Children of Priam
Princes in Greek mythology
Achaeans (Homer)
Pylian characters in Greek mythology